Daš Extra Radio or Radio Daš Extra is a Bosnian local commercial radio station, broadcasting from Bijeljina, Bosnia and Herzegovina.

The owner of the local radio station is the company M.B. KOMPANI d.o.o. Bijeljina  which also operates Daš Radio radio station.

The program is mainly produced in Serbian at one FM frequency (Bijeljina ) and it is available in the city of Bijeljina as well as in nearby municipalities in Semberija area. This radio station is formatted as urban Top 40 radio.

Estimated number of listeners of Daš Extra Radio is around 65.611.

Frequencies
 Bijeljina

See also 
 List of radio stations in Bosnia and Herzegovina
 Daš Radio
 BN Radio
 Bobar Radio
 Bobar Radio - Studio B2
 RSG Radio

References

External links 
 www.radiodas.net
 www.dasextra.ba
 www.radiostanica.ba
 www.fmscan.org
 Communications Regulatory Agency of Bosnia and Herzegovina

Bijeljina
Radio stations established in 2007
Bijeljina
Mass media in Bijeljina